This is a partial list of universities and colleges in the Philippines.

A
Abada Colleges – Pinamalayan, Oriental Mindoro
ABEC Institute of Business and Technology – Legazpi City, Albay
ABE International College of Business and Accountancy – Quezon City, Metro Manila
Abra Valley Colleges – Bangued, Abra
Abuyog Community College (ACC) – Abuyog, Leyte
Academia de Davao College (ADDC) – Tagum City, Davao del Norte
Access Computer College – Sampaloc, Manila
Aces Tagum College (ATC) – Tagum City, Davao del Norte
ACQ College of Ministries – Davao City
ACMCL College – Victoria, Oriental Mindoro
ACLC College – Quezon City, Metro Manila
ACSI College – Iloilo City. Iloilo
ACTS Computer College – Sta. Cruz Laguna
Adamson University – Ermita, Manila
Adventist International Institute of Advanced Studies – Silang, Cavite
Adventist University of the Philippines – Silang, Cavite
Aemilianum College – Sorsogon City, Sorsogon
Aeronautical Academy of the Philippines – Canaman, Camarines Sur
Agro-Industrial Foundation College of the Philippines – Davao City
Agusan del Sur College – Bayugan, Agusan del Sur
AIE College – Navotas, Metro Manila
Airlink International Aviation College – Pasay, Metro Manila
Aklan Catholic College – Kalibo, Aklan
Aklan Polytechnic College – Kalibo, Aklan
Aklan State University – Banga, Aklan
Aldersgate College – Solano, Nueva Vizcaya
Alfelor Memorial College – Del Gallego, Camarines Sur
Alfonso D. Tan College – Tangub City, Misamis Occidental
Alpha Centauri Educational System (ACES) – Lucena City, Quezon
AMA University or AMA Computer University – Quezon City, Metro Manila
Amando Cope College – Tabaco City, Albay
Andres Bonifacio College – Dipolog, Zamboanga del Norte
Angeles University Foundation – Angeles City, Pampanga
Apostle Business College – San Francisco, Agusan del Sur
Annunciation College of Bacon Sorsogon – Sorsogon City, Sorsogon
Araullo University – Cabanatuan, Nueva Ecija
Arellano University – Sampaloc, Manila
Arreisgado College Foundation – Tagum City, Davao del Norte
Asia Pacific College – Makati, Metro Manila
Asian Pacific College of Advanced Studies – Balanga City, Bataan
Asia School of Arts and Sciences – Quezon City, Metro Manila
Asian College, Dumaguete – Dumaguete, Negros Oriental
Asian College of Technology – Cebu City, Cebu
Asian College – Quezon City, Metro Manila
Asian College Foundation – Butuan City, Agusan del Norte
Asian Computer College – Calamba, Laguna
Asian Development Foundation College – Tacloban City, Leyte
Asian International School of Aeronautics and Technology – Davao City
Asian Institute for Distance Education – Makati, Metro Manila
 Asian Institute of Computer Studies – Quezon City, Metro Manila
Asian Institute of Journalism and Communication – Sampaloc, Manila
Asian Institute of Management – Makati, Metro Manila
Asian Institute of Maritime Studies – Pasay, Metro Manila
Asian School of Hospitality Arts – Antipolo, Rizal
Asian Social Institute – Malate, Manila
Asian Summit College – Pasig, Metro Manila
Assumption College San Lorenzo – Makati, Metro Manila
Assumption Antipolo – Antipolo, Rizal
Assumption Iloilo – Iloilo City, Iloilo
Assumption College of Davao – Davao City
  Assumption College of Nabunturan – Nabunturan, Davao de Oro
Assumption College San Lorenzo – Makati, Metro Manila
Ateneo de Cagayan – Xavier University – Cagayan de Oro, Misamis Oriental
Ateneo de Davao University – Davao City, Davao del Sur
Ateneo de Manila University – Quezon City, Metro Manila
Ateneo de Naga University – Naga City, Camarines Sur
Ateneo de Zamboanga University – Zamboanga City
Aurora Pioneers Memorial College – Aurora, Zamboanga del Sur
Aurora Polytechnic College – Baler, Aurora
Aurora State College of Technology – Baler, Aurora

B
Baao Community College – Baao, Camarines Sur
Bacacay Community College – Bacacay, Albay
Bacolod City College – Bacolod City, Negros Occidental
Bago City College – Bago City, Negros Occidental
Baguio Central University – Baguio
Baguio College of Technology – Baguio
Balete Community College – Balete, Aklan
Baliuag Polytechnic College – Baliuag, Bulacan
Baliuag University – Baliuag, Bulacan
Baptist Voice Bible College – Lucena, Quezon
Basilan State College – Isabela, Basilan
Bataan Peninsula State University – Balanga, Bataan 
Bataan Heroes Memorial College – Balanga, Bataan
Bataan State College – Dinalupihan, Bataan
Batan Community College – Batan, Aklan
Batanes State College – Basco, Batanes
Batangas Eastern Colleges – San Juan, Batangas
Batangas State University – Batangas City, Batangas
The Bearer of Light and Wisdom Colleges – Bacoor City, Cavite
Belen B. Francisco Foundation- Daraga, Albay 
Benguet State University – La Trinidad, Benguet
Bestlink College of the Philippines – Novaliches, Quezon City, Metro Manila
The Bethany Christian Academy – Cabanatuan, Nueva Ecija
Bicol Christian College of Medicine (Ago Medical and Educational Center) – Legazpi City, Albay
Bicol College – Daraga, Albay
Bicol Merchant Marine College – Sorsogon City, Sorsogon
Bicol State College of Applied Sciences and Technology – Naga City, Camarines Sur
 Bicol University – Legazpi City, Albay
Biliran National Agricultural College – Biliran, Biliran Province
Binalbagan Catholic College – Binalbagan, Negros Occidental
Binangonan Catholic College – Binangonan, Rizal
Bohol Institute of Technology – Tagbilaran City, Bohol
Bohol Island State University – Tagbilaran City, Bohol
Bohol Northeastern Education Foundation – Ubay, Bohol
Bool City Central University – Bool City, Biliran 
Brent Hospital and Colleges Inc. – Zamboanga City
Brentwood College of Asia International School – Naga City, Camarines Sur
 Brokenshire College – Davao City
Brookfield College – Dasmariñas City, Cavite
BST Grace College – San Fernando, Camarines Sur
 Bukidnon State University – Malaybalay City, Bukidnon
Bulacan Agricultural State College – San Idelfonso, Bulacan
Bulacan Polytechnic College – Malolos, Bulacan
Bulacan State University – Malolos, Bulacan

C
Cabucgayan National School of Arts and Trades – Cabucgayan, Biliran
Cagayan de Oro College – Cagayan de Oro
Cagayan State University – Tuguegarao City, Cagayan
Cagayan Technical Institute School of Automotive – Tuguegarao City, Cagayan
Cagayan Valley Computer and Information Technology College- Santiago, Isabela
Cainta Catholic College – Cainta, Rizal
Calabanga Community College – Calabanga, Camarines Sur
Calamba Doctors' College – Calamba City, Laguna
Calauag Central College – Calauag, Quezon 
Calayan Educational Foundation Inc. – Lucena City, Quezon 
Camarines Norte State College – Daet, Camarines Norte
Camiling Colleges – Camiling, Tarlac
Camo College Incorporated – Pili, Camarines Sur
Canossa Colleges – San Pablo City, Laguna
CAP College Foundation – Makati City, Metro Manila
Capalonga College – Capalonga, Camarines Norte
Capitol University – Cagayan de Oro
Capiz State University – Roxas City, Capiz
Caraga State University – Butuan, Agusan del Norte
Carlos Hilado Memorial State University – Talisay City, Negros Occidental
Cataingan Polytechnic Institute – Cataingan, Masbate
Catanduanes Colleges – Virac, Catanduanes
Catanduanes Institute of Technology Foundation Inc. – Virac, Catanduanes
Catanduanes State University – Virac, Catanduanes
Cavite State University – Indang, Cavite
Cebu Aeronautical Technical School – Lahug, Cebu City
Cebu Doctors' University – Mandaue City, Cebu
Cebu Eastern College – Cebu City, Cebu
Cebu Institute of Medicine – Cebu City, Cebu
Cebu Institute of Technology – University – Cebu City, Cebu
Cebu International Distance Education College – Cebu City, Cebu
Cebu Normal University – Cebu City, Cebu
Cebu Roosevelt Memorial Colleges – Bogo City, Cebu
Cebu Technological University – Cebu City, Cebu
Ceguera Technological Colleges – Iriga City, Camarines Sur.
Center for Industrial Technology and Enterprise (CITE) Technical Institute – Cebu City, Cebu
Central Bicol State University of Agriculture – Pili, Camarines Sur
Central Colleges of the North – Tuguegarao City, Cagayan
Central Colleges of the Philippines – Quezon City, Metro Manila
Central Luzon College of Science and Technology – San Fernando, Pampanga
Central Luzon Doctors' Hospital Educational Institution – Tarlac City, Tarlac
Central Luzon State University – Munoz City, Nueva Ecija
Central Mindanao University – Maramag, Bukidnon
Central Panay College of Science and Technology – Kalibo, Aklan
Central Philippine Adventist College – Murcia, Negros Occidental
Central Philippine University – Jaro, Iloilo City
Central Philippines State University – Kabankalan City, Negros Occidental
Centre for International Education (CIE) – Makati City, Metro Manila
Centro Escolar University – San Miguel, Manila
Chiang Kai Shek College – Tondo, Manila
Chinese General Hospital Colleges – Santa Cruz, Manila
Christ the King College – Calbayog City, Samar
Christ the King College – Gingoog City, Misamis Oriental
Christ the King College de Maranding – Maranding Lala, Lanao del Norte
Christ the King Mission Seminary – Quezon City, Metro Manila
Christian Polytechnic Institute of Catanduanes – Virac, Catanduanes
Chronicles Institute of Isabela – Ilagan City, Isabela
CIIT College of Arts and Technology – Tomas Morato, Quezon City
Citi Global College of Cabuyao – Cabuyao, Laguna
City College of Calamba – Calamba, Laguna
City College of Lucena – Lucena City, Quezon
City College of Naga – Naga City, Camarines Sur
City College of Tagaytay - Tagaytay City, Cavite
City of Malabon University – Malabon City, Metro Manila
City Technological Institute – Tuguegarao City, Cagayan
Claret College of Isabela – Isabela City, Basilan
Claret Formation Center – Quezon City, Metro Manila
Colegio de Capitolio – Tagum City, Davao del Norte
Colegio de Dagupan – Dagupan City, Pangasinan
Colegio de Ilagan – Ilagan City, Isabela
Colegio de la Purisima Concepcion – Roxas City, Capiz
Colegio de Medaillè Miraculous, Inc. – Subic, Zambales
Colegio de Muntinlupa – Muntinlupa City, Metro Manila
Colegio de San Clemente – Angono, Rizal
Colegio de San Francisco Javier – Rizal, Zamboanga del Norte
Colegio de San Gabriel – Arcangel – San Jose del Monte, Bulacan
Colegio de San Jose – Jaro, Iloilo City
Colegio de San Juan de Letran – Intramuros, Manila 
Colegio de San Juan de Letran – Abucay, Bataan
Colegio de San Juan de Letran – Calamba, Laguna
Colegio de San Juan de Letran – Manaoag, Pangasinan
Colegio de San Lorenzo – Quezon City, Metro Manila
Colegio de San Lorenzo Ruiz de Manila – Tacloban City, Leyte
Colegio de San Lorenzo Ruiz de Manila of Northern Samar – Catarman, Northern Samar
Colegio de San Pascual Baylon – Obando, Bulacan
Colegio de Santa Catalina de Alejandria – Dumaguete City, Negros Oriental
Colegio de Santo Cristo de Burgos – Sariaya, Quezon
Colegio de Santo Tomas - Recoletos – San Carlos City, Negros Occidental
Colegio de Sta. Teresa de Avila – Novaliches, Quezon City
Colegio del Sagrado Corazon de Jesus – Iloilo City, Iloilo
Colegio ng Lungsod ng Batangas – Batangas City, Batangas
Colegio San Agustin-Bacolod – Bacolod City, Negros Occidental
Colegio San Agustin-Biñan – Biñan, Lagunna
College of Arts & Sciences of Asia & the Pacific – Pasig, Metro Manila
College of Business Education Science and Technology – Cauayan City, Isabela
College of Divine Wisdom – Parañaque City, Metro Manila
College of the Holy Spirit – San Miguel, Manila
College of the Immaculate Conception – Cabanatuan, Nueva Ecija
College of Mary Immaculate – Pandi, Bulacan
College of Our Lady of Mercy of Pulilan Foundation – Pulilan, Bulacan
College of Mt. Carmel – Lolomboy, Bulacan
College of Saint Lawrence – Balagtas, Bulacan
College of San Benildo – Rizal – Antipolo, Rizal
College of St. John-Roxas – Roxas City, Capiz
College of Technological Sciences – Cebu City, Cebu
Columban College – Olongapo City, Zambales
Columbus College – Lucena City, Quezon
Community Colleges of the Philippines Foundation – Manila
Computer Arts & Technological (CAT) College – Legazpi, Albay
Computer Communication Development Institute (CCDI) College – Naga City, Camarines Sur
COMTECH International Institute of Technologies Inc. (CIITI Colleges) – Zamboanga City
Comteq Computer ad Business College – Olongapo City, Zambales
Concordia College – Paco, Manila
Consolatrix College of Toledo City – Toledo City, Cebu
Cor Jesu College – Digos, Davao del Sur
Core Gateway College – San Jose City, Nueva Ecija
Cotabato Foundation College of Science and Technology – Arakan, Cotabato
Cotabato Medical Foundation College Inc. – Midsayap, Cotabato City
Cotabato State University – Cotabato City, Maguindanao
Credo Domine College – Tuguegarao City, Cagayan

D
Daniel B. Peña Memorial College Foundation – Tabaco City, Albay
Daraga Community College – Daraga, Albay
Data Center College of the Philippines – Baguio Campus
Data Center College of the Philippines – Bangued Branch
Data Center College of the Philippines – Vigan City Branch
Datamex Institute of Computer Technology
Davao Central College – Davao City
Davao del Norte State College – Panabo City, Davao del Norte
Davao Doctors' College – Davao City
Davao Medical School Foundation – Davao City
Davao Oriental State University – Mati, Davao Oriental
De La Salle University-Manila – Malate, Manila 
De La Salle University-Dasmariñas – Dasmariñas City, Cavite
De La Salle Araneta University – Malabon, Metro Manila
De La Salle Andres Soriano Memorial College – Toledo City, Cebu
De La Salle-College of Saint Benilde – Malate, Manila
De La Salle John Bosco College – Bislig City, Surigao del Sur 
De La Salle Lipa – Lipa City, Batangas
De La Salle Medical and Health Sciences Institute – Dasmarinas City, Cavite
De Ocampo Memorial College – Sta. Mesa, Manila
Dee Hwa Liong College Foundation – Angeles City, Pampanga
De Los Santos – STI College – Quezon City, Metro Manila
De Paul College – Iloilo City, Iloilo
Diaz College – Tanjay City, Negros Oriental
Dipolog Medical Center College Foundation – Dipolog, Zamboanga del Norte
Divine Word College of Bangued – Bangued, Abra
Divine Word College of Calapan – Calapan, Oriental Mindoro
Divine Word College of Laoag – Laoag City, Ilocos Norte
Divine Word College of Legazpi – Legazpi City, Albay
Divine Word College of San Jose – San Jose, Occidental Mindoro
Divine Word College of Urdaneta – Urdaneta, Pangasinan
Divine Word College of Vigan – Vigan City, Ilocos Sur
Divine Word College Seminary – Tagaytay City, Cavite
Divine Word Mission Seminary – Quezon City, Metro Manila
Divine Word University of Tacloban – Tacloban City, Leyte
Dominican College of Iloilo – Zarraga, Iloilo
Dominican College of Sta. Rosa – Sta. Rosa City, Laguna
Dominican College of Tarlac – Capas, Tarlac
Don Bosco College, Canlubang – Canlubang, Laguna
Don Bosco Technical College – Mandaluyong, Metro Manila
Don Bosco Technical Institute, Tarlac – Tarlac City, Tarlac
Don Bosco Technical Institute, Victorias – Victorias City, Negros Occidental
Don Honorio Ventura Technological State University – Bacolor, Pampanga
Don Mariano Marcos Memorial State University – Bacnotan, La Union
Dr. Carlos S. Lanting College – Quezon City, Metro Manila
Dr. Emilio B. Espinosa Sr. Memorial State College of Agriculture and Technology – Mandaon, Masbate
Dr. Filemon C. Aguilar Memorial College of Las Piñas – Las Piñas City, Metro Manila
Dr. Yanga's Colleges – Bocaue, Bulacan

E
East Asia International System College – Cauayan City, Isabela
Easter College – Baguio
Eastern Cordillera State College of Agriculture, Science and Technology – Potia, Ifugao
Eastern Luzon Colleges – Bambang, Nueva Vizcaya
Eastern Mindanao College of Technology (EMCOTECH) – Pagadian City, Zamboanga del Sur
Eastern Mindoro Institute of Technology and Sciences (EMA Emits College Philippines) – Pinamalayan, Oriental Mindoro
Eastern Samar State University – Borongan, Eastern Samar
Eastern Tayabas College – Lopez, Quezon
Eastern Visayas State University – Tacloban City, Leyte 
Eastwoods Professional College – Balanga, Bataan
Eduardo L. Joson Memorial College – Palayan City, Nueva Ecija
Educational Systems Technological Institute (ESTI) – Boac, Marinduque
Emilio Aguinaldo College – Ermita, Manila
Emmanuel College of Plaridel – Plaridel, Bulacan
Enderun Colleges – Taguig City, Metro Manila,
Entrepreneurs School of Asia – Quezon City, Metro Manila
Escuela de Nuestra Señora de La Salette – Dagupan City, Pangasinan
Eulogio "Amang" Rodriguez Institute of Science and Technology (EARIST) – Santa Mesa, Manila
 Eveland Christian College – San Mateo, Isabela

F
Far East Asia Pacific Institute of Tourism Science and Technology, Inc. (Feapitsat Colleges) – Tanza, Cavite
Far Eastern University – Sampaloc, Manila
Far Eastern University Institute of Technology (FEU Tech) – Sampaloc, Manila
Far Eastern University Diliman – Diliman Quezon City
Far Eastern University – Nicanor Reyes Medical Foundation – West Fairview, Quezon City
Far Eastern University Alabang – Alabang, Muntinlupa
Far Eastern University Cavite – Silang, Cavite
FEATI University – Santa Cruz, Manila
Felix O. Alfelor Sr. Foundation College – Sipocot, Camarines Sur
Fellowship Baptist College -Kabankalan City, Negros Occidental
Fernandez College of Arts and Technology – Baliuag, Bulacan
Filamer Christian University – Roxas City, Capiz
First Asia Institute of Technology and Humanities – Tanauan, Batangas
First City Providential College – City of San Jose Del Monte, Bulacan
Five Star Technical Institute – Tuguegarao City, Cagayan
Florencio L. Vargas College – Tuguegarao City, Cagayan
Forbes College – Legazpi City, Albay
Foundation University – Dumaguete City, Negros Oriental
Fr. Saturnino Urios University – Butuan City, Agusan del Norte 
Franciscan College of the Immaculate Conception – Baybay City, Leyte

G
Gallego Foundation Colleges – Cabanatuan, Nueva Ecija
Garcia College of Technology – Kalibo, Aklan
Gateways Institute of Science and Technology – Pasig City, Metro Mamila
Gensantos Foundation College – General Santos City, South Cotabato
Gen. Santos Doctors' Medical School Foundation Inc. – General Santos City, South Cotabato
General de Jesus College – San Isidro, Nueva Ecija
Global City Innovative College – Bonifacio Global City, Taguig
Global Computer INFOTEQ School – Cainta, Rizal
Global iT Colleges – Naga City, Camarines Sur
Global Reciprocal Colleges – Caloocan City, Metro Manila 
Gordon College – Olongapo City, Zambales
Grace Christian College – Quezon City, Metro Manila
Greatways Technical Institute – Makati, Metro Manila 
Green Valley College Foundation – Koronadal City, South Cotabato
Greenville College – Pasig, Metro Manila
Golden Gate Colleges – Batangas City, Batangas
Golden Link College Foundation – Caloocan City, Metro Manila
Goldenstate College – General Santos City, South Cotabato
Governor Andres Pascual College – Navotas City, Metro Manila
Governor Mariano E. Villafuerte Community College – Garchitorena, Camarines Sur 
Guagua National Colleges – Guagua, Pampanga
Guimaras State College – 	Buenavista, Guimaras
Guzman College of Science and Technology – Quiapo, Manila

H
HGBaquiran College – Tumauini, Isabela
Holy Angel University – Angeles City, Pampanga
Holy Name University – Tagbilaran, Bohol
Holy Trinity College – Puerto Princesa City, Palawan
Hua Siong College of Iloilo – Iloilo City, Iloilo
Holy Cross of Davao College – Davao City, Dvao del Sur
Holy Cross College of Calinan – Davao City
Holy Cross College – Pampanga – Santa Ana, Pampanga

I
iACADEMY – Makati, Metro Manila
Ifugao State University – Lamut, Ifugao
IIH College – Novaliches, Quezon City, Metro Manila
Iligan Capitol College – Iligan City, Lanao del Norte
Iligan Medical Center College – Iligan City, Lanao del Norte
Ilocos Sur Polytechnic State College – Santa Maria, Ilocos Sur.
Iloilo Doctors' College – Molo, Iloilo City
Iloilo Science and Technology University – Iloilo City, Iloilo
Iloilo State College of Fisheries – Barotac Nuevo, Iloilo
Immaculate Concepcion College – Balayan, Batangas
Immaculate Conception International College of Arts – Balagtas, Bulacan
Immaculate Heart of Mary College – Parañaque City, Metro Manila
Imus Computer College (ICC) – Imus City, Cavite
Imus Institute of Science and Technology – Imus City, Cavite
Infant Jesus Montessori School College Department – Santiago City, Isabela
Informatics International College (multiple campuses)
Information and Communications Technology Academy (iACADEMY)
Infotech Development Systems Colleges (IDS Colleges) – Ligao City
Infotech Institute of Arts and Sciences – Pasig City, Metro Manila
Innovative College of Science in Information Technology (ICST) – Bongabong, Oriental Mindoro
Institute of Enterprise Solutions (IES) – Phils, San Jose City, Nueva Ecija
Interface Computer College – Sampaloc, Manila 
International Academy of Film and Television (IAFT) – Lapu-Lapu City, Cebu
International Academy of Management and Economics – Makati City, Metro Manila
International Baptist College (IBC) – Mandaluyong City, Metro Manila
International Electronics and Technical Institute (IETI) – Makati, Metro Manila
International School of Asia and the Pacific – Tuguegarao City, Cagayan
International Technological Institute of Arts and Tourism – Ilagan City, Isabela
Isabela College of Arts and Technology – Cauayan City, Isabela
Isabela Colleges – Cauayan City, Isabela
Isabela Colleges of Science & Technology – Roxas, Isabela
Isabela State University – Echague, Isabela

J
J.H. Cerilles State College of Zamboanga del Sur – San Miguel, Zamboanga del Sur
Jake Battaring University Tumauini, Isabela
Jamiatu Muslim Mindanao – Marawi City, Lanao del Sur
JE Mondejar Computer College – Tacloban City, Leyte
Jesus Reigns Christian College – Malate, Manila
John B. Lacson Colleges Foundation – Alijis, Bacolod City
John B. Lacson Foundation Maritime University – Arevalo, Iloilo City
John B. Lacson Foundation Maritime University – Molo, Iloilo City
John Paul College – Odiong, Roxas, Oriental Mindoro
John Paul College – Davao City
John Wesley College – Tuguegarao City, Cagayan
Joji Ilagan International Schools – Davao City
Jose C. Feliciano College – Mabalacat, Pampanga
Jose Rizal Memorial State University – Dapitan City, Zamboanga del Norte
Jose Rizal University – Mandaluyong City, Metro Manila
Jose Maria College – Davao City, Davao del Sur
JP Sioson General Hospital and Colleges – Quezon City, Metro Manila

K
Kabankalan Catholic College (KCC) – Kabankalan, Negros Occidental
Kalayaan College – Quezon City, Metro Manila 
KCI Colleges – Isulan, Sultan Kudarat
Kolehiyo ng Subic – Subic, Zambales
Kolehiyo Ng Pantukan (KNP) -Pantukan, Davao de Oro
Kutawato Darussalam College – Cotabato City, Maguindanao del Norte

L
La Carlota City College – La Carlota, Negros Occidental
La Concordia College – Paco, Manila
La Consolacion College – Caloocan City, Metro Manila
La Consolacion College – Bais City, Negros Oriental
La Consolacion College – Bacolod, Negros Occidental
La Consolacion College – Biñan, Laguna
La Consolacion College – Daet, Camarines Norte
La Consolacion College – Iriga City, Camarines Sur
La Consolacion College – Liloan, Cebu
La Consolacion College – San Miguel, Manila
La Consolacion College - Novaliches – Caloocan City, Metro Manila
La Consolacion College – Pasig, Metro Manila
La Consolacion College – Tanauan City, Batangas
La Consolacion College – Trento, Agusan del Sur
La Consolacion University Philippines – Malolos City, Bulacan
La Fortuna College – Cabanatuan, Nueva Ecija
La Union Colleges of Nursing, Arts and Sciences – San Fernando City, La Union
La Verdad Christian College – Apalit, Pampanga
La Verdad Christian College – Caloocan City, Metro Manila
Lacson College – Pasay City, Metro Manila
Laguna Business College – Sta. Rosa, Laguna
Laguna College – San Pablo City, Laguna
Laguna College of Business and Arts – Calamba City, Laguna
Laguna Northwestern College – San Pedro, Laguna
Laguna State Polytechnic University – Santa Cruz, Laguna
 Laguna University – Santa. Cruz, Laguna
 Lapu-Lapu City College – Lapu-Lapu City, Cebu
La Salle College Antipolo – Antipolo City, Rizal
La Salle University-Ozamiz – Ozamiz City, Misamis Occidental
Las Piñas College – Almanza, Las Piñas City, Metro Manila
Lheny Ganda Santos College – Zaragoza, Nueva Ecija
Lemery Colleges – Lemery, Batangas
Leyte Institute of Technology – Tacloban City, Leyte
Leyte Normal University – Tacloban City, Leyte
Liceo de Cagayan University – Cagayan de Oro
Liceo de Davao – Tagum City, Davao del Norte
Liceo del Verbo Divino – Tacloban City, Leyte 
LIEMG Language Center – Valenzuela City, Metro Manila
Ligao Community College – Ligao City, Albay
Lipa City Colleges – Lipa City, Batangas
Lipa City Public College – Lipa City, Batangas 
Lorma College – San Fernando City, La Union
Lourdes College – Cagayan de Oro
Loyola College of Culion – Culion, Palawan
Luna Goco Colleges – Calapan City, Oriental Mindoro
Lyceum-Northwestern University – Dagupan City, Pangasinan
Lyceum of Alabang – Muntinlupa City, Metro Manila 
Lyceum of Aparri – Aparri, Cagayan
Lyceum of Cebu – Cebu City, Cebu
Lyceum of the Philippines University – Intramuros, Manila
Lyceum of the Philippines University, Batangas – Batangas City, Batangas
Lyceum of the Philippines University-Laguna – Calamba City, Laguna
Lyceum of the Philippines University-Cavite – General Trias City, Cavite
Lyceum of the Philippines University – Makati – Makati
Lyceum of Subic Bay – Subic, Zambales
Lyceum of Tuao – Tuao, Cagayan

M
Maasin City College – Maasin City, Southern Leyte
Mabalacat College – Mabalacat, Pampanga
Magsaysay Memorial College – San Narciso, Zambales
Maila Rosario College – Tuguegarao City, Cagayan
Mallig Plains Colleges – Mallig, Isabela
Mambog Institute of Technology-Mambog – Pinabacdao, Samar
Mandaue City College – Mandaue City, Cebu
Manila Adventist Medical Center and Colleges – Pasay, Metro Manila
Manila Business College – Santa Cruz, Manila
Manila Central University – Caloocan City, Metro Manila
Manila Christian Computer Institute for the Deaf College of Technology – San Mateo, Rizal
Manila Tytana Colleges – Pasay City, Metro Manila
Manuel L. Quezon University – Quezon City, Metro Manila
Manuel S. Enverga University Foundation - Lucena City, Quezon
Mapúa Malayan Colleges Laguna – Cabuyao City, Laguna
Mapúa Malayan Colleges Mindanao - Davao City
Mapúa University – Intramuros, Manila
Marasigan Institute of Science and Technology – Dasmariñas City, Cavite
Marian College – Ipil, Zamboanga Sibugay
Mariano Marcos State University, Batac City, Ilocos Norte 
Marikina Polytechnic College – Marikina, Metro Manila
Marinduque Midwest College – Gasan, Marinduque
Marinduque State University – Boac, Marinduque
Mariners' Polytechnic Colleges Foundation – Legazpi City, Albay
Martinez Colleges – Caloocan City, Metro Manila
Mary Chiles College – Sampaloc, Manila 
Mary Johnston College of Nursing – Tondo, Manila
Mary the Queen College (Pampanga) – Guagua, Pampanga
Maryhill College – Lucena City, Quezon
Masbate Colleges – Masbate City, Masbate
Masters Technological Institute of Mindanao (MTIM) – Iligan City, Lanao del Norte 
Mater Dei College – Tubigon, Bohol
MATS College of Technology – Davao City
Maxino College – Dumaguete City, Negros Oriental
Medical Colleges of Northern Philippines – Peñablanca, Cagayan 
Medina College-Ozamiz – Ozamiz City, Misamis Occidental
Medina College-Ipil – Ipil, Zamboanga Sibugay
Medina College – Pagadian – Pagadian City, Zamboanga del Sur
Medina Foundation College – Sapang Dalaga, Misamis Occidental
Mendero College – Pagadian City, Zamboanga del Sur
Meridian International Business, Arts & Technology College (MINT College) – (Taguig, Pasig & Quezon City)
Messiah College – Mandaluyong City, Metro Manila
Metro Business College (formerly Metro Data Computer College) – Pasay City, Metro Manila
Metro Dumaguete College – Dumaguete City, Negros Oriental
Metro Manila College – Novaliches, Quezon City
Metropolitan Medical Center College of Arts, Science and Technology – Santa Cruz, Manila
Metropolitan School of Science and Technology – Santiago City, Isabela
Meycauayan College – Meycauayan City, Bulacan
Microcity Computer College Foundation – Balanga City, Bataan
Mind And Integrity College – Calamba City, Laguna
Mindanao Aeronautical Technical School College of Technology – Davao City
Mindanao Autonomous College – Lamitan City, Basilan
Mindanao Kokusai Daigaku (Mindanao International College) – Davao City
Mindanao Medical Foundation College – Davao City
Mindanao Polytechnic College – General Santos City
Mindanao Sanitarium and Hospital College – Iligan City, Davao del Sur
Mindanao State University – Marawi Lanao del Sur
Mindanao University of Science and Technology – Lapasan, Cagayan de Oro
Mindoro State University – Victoria, Oriental Mindoro
Miriam College – Quezon City, Metro Manila
Misamis Oriental State College of Agriculture and Technology – Claveria, Misamis Oriental
Misamis University – Ozamiz City, Misamis Occidental.
Mondriaan Aura College – Subic, Zambales 
Monkayo College of Arts, Science and Technology (MONCAST) – Monkayo, Davao de Oro
Montessori Professional College International (MPCI)
Montessori Professional College International – Antipolo City, Rizal
Montessori Professional College International – Bacoor City, Cavite
Montessori Professional College International – Caloocan City, Metro Manila
Montessori Professional College International – Dasmariñas
Montessori Professional College International – Imus
Montessori Professional College International – Largo
Montessori Professional College International – Makati
Montessori Professional College International – Marikina
Montessori Professional College International – Muñoz
Montessori Professional College International – Pasay
Montessori Professional College International – Pasig
Montessori Professional College International – Recto
Montessori Professional College International – Calamba
Mount Carmel College – Baler, Aurora
Mount Carmel College – Escalante City, Negros Occidental
Mountain Province State Polytechnic College – Bontoc, Mountain Province
Mountain View College – Valencia City, Bukidnon
Mystical Rose College of Science and Technology – Mangatarem, Pangasinan

N
Naga College Foundation – Naga, Camarines Sur Camarines Sur
Naga View Adventist College – Naga City, Camarines Sur
NAMEI Polytechnic Institute – Mandaluyong, Metro Manila
National College of Business and Arts 
National College of Business and Arts – Cubao, Quezon City
National College of Business and Arts – Fairview, Quezon City
National College of Business and Arts – Taytay, Rizal
National College of Science and Technology – Dasmariñas City, Cavite
National Police College Regional Training School – Cauayan City, Isabela
National Teachers College – Quiapo, Manila
National University – Sampaloc, Manila
Naval State University – Naval, Biliran
Navotas Polytechnic College – Navotas City, Metro Manila
Nazarenus College and Hospital Foundation, Inc. – Valenzuela City, Metro Manila
Negros College – Ayungon, Negros Oriental
Negros Maritime College Foundation, Inc. – Sibulan, Negros Oriental
Negros Navigation Oceanlink Institute – Pier 2 North Harbor, Tondo, Manila
Negros Oriental State University – Dumaguete City, Negros Oriental
New Era University – Quezon City, Metro Manila
Northeast Luzon Adventist College – Alicia, Isabela
Northeastern College – Santiago City, Isabela
Northeastern Mindanao Colleges – Surigao City, Surigao del Norte
North Eastern Mindanao State University – Tandag City, Surigao del Sur
Northlink Technological college – Panabo City, Davao del Norte
Northwest Samar State University – Calbayog City, Samar
Northwestern Visayan Colleges – Kalibo, Aklan
Northwestern University (Philippines) – Laoag City, Ilocos Norte
North Davao College Tagum Foundation – Tagum City, Davao del Norte
 North Luzon Philippines State College – Candon City, Ilocos Sur
Northern Cagayan Colleges Foundation – Ballesteros, Cagayan
Northern Christian College – Laoag City, Ilocos Norte
Northern Davao Colleges – Panabo City, Davao del Norte
Northern Luzon Adventist College – Sison, Pangasinan
Northern Negros State College of Science and Technology – Sagay City, Negros Occidental,
Northern Philippines College for Maritime Science and Technology – San Fernando, La Union
Northern Samar Colleges – Catarman, Northern Samar
Northern Zambales College – Masinloc, Zambales
Notre Dame of Dadiangas University – General Santos City, South Cotabato
Notre Dame of Isulan – Isulan, Sultan Kudarat
Notre Dame of Jolo College – Jolo, Sulu
Notre Dame of Kidapawan College – Kidapawan City, Cotabato
Notre Dame of Marbel University – Koronadal City, South Cotabato.
Notre Dame of Midsayap College – Midsayap, Cotabato
Notre Dame of Tacurong College – Tacurong City, Sultan Kudarat
Notre Dame – Siena College of Polomolok – Polomolok, South Cotabato
Notre Dame University – Cotabato City, Maguindanao
Nueva Ecija University of Science and Technology – Cabanatuan, Nueva Ecija
Nueva Vizcaya State University – Bayombong, Nueva Vizcaya
Nuevo Zamboanga College – Zamboanga City

O
Oas Community College – Oas, Albay
Occidental Mindoro State College – San Jose, Occidental Mindoro
Olivarez College – Parañaque City, Metro Manila
Opol Community College – Opol, Misamis Oriental
Osmeña Colleges – Masbate City, Masbate
Our Lady of Assumption College – San Pedro, Laguna (Main)
Our Lady of Fatima University – Valenzuela City, Metro Manila
Our Lady of Guadalupe Colleges – Mandaluyong City, Metro Manila
Our Lady of Lourdes College – Valenzuela City, Metro Manila
Our Lady of Manaoag College – Manaoag, Pangasinan
Our Lady of Mercy College – Borongan, Eastern Samar
Our Lady of Perpetual Succor College – Marikina, Metro Manila
Our Lady of the Pillar College – Cauayan City, Isabela
 Our Lady of the Pillar College – San Manuel, Isabela

P
Pacific InterContinental College (PIC), Inc. – Las Piñas City, Metro Manila
Palawan State University – Puerto Princesa, Palawan
Palompon Institute of Technology – Palompon, Leyte
Pamantasan ng Cabuyao – Cabuyao, Laguna
Pamantasan ng Montalban – Montalban, Rizal
Pamantasan ng Lungsod ng Maynila – Manila
Pamantasan ng Lungsod ng Maynila, District Colleges
Pamantasan ng Lungsod ng Marikina – Marikina City, Metro Manila
Pamantasan ng Lungsod ng Muntinlupa – Muntinlupa City, Metro Manila 
Pamantasan ng Lungsod ng Pasay – Pasay City, Metro Manila 
Pamantasan ng Lungsod ng Pasig – Pasig City Metro Manila 
  Pamantasan ng Lungsod ng San Pablo – San Pablo City, Laguna
Pamantasan ng Lungsod ng Valenzuela – Valenzuela City, Metro Manila
Pambayang Kolehiyo ng Mauban – Mauban, Quezon
Pampanga Agricultural College – Magalang, Pampanga
Pampanga Colleges – Macabebe, Pampanga
Pangasinan State University – Lingayen, Pangasinan
Panpacific University North Philippines – Tayug, Pangasinan
Panpacific University – Urdaneta City, Pangasinan
Panay Technological College – Kalibo, Aklan
Partido State University – Goa, Camarines Sur
Pasig Catholic College – Pasig, Metro Manila
Pateros Technological College – Pateros, Metro Manila
Patria Sable Corpus College – Santiago City, Isabela
PATTS College of Aeronautics – Parañaque, Metro Manila
Peña de Francia College – Naga City Camarines Sur
Philippine Advent College – Sindangan, Zamboanga del Norte
Philippine Best Training System Colleges – Binangonan, Rizal
Philippine Cambridge School – Dasmariñas, Cavite
Philippine Cambridge School – GMA, Cavite
Philippine Cambridge School – Imus, Cavite
Philippine Cambridge School – Noveleta, Cavite
Philippine Central Islands College (PCIC) – San Jose, Occidental Mindoro
Philippine Christian University – Malate, Manila
Philippine Countryville College, (PCC) – Maramag, Bukidnon
Philippine College of Criminology (PCCr) – Sta. Cruz, Manila
Philippine College of Health Sciences – Sampaloc, Manila
Philippine College of Technology – Davao City
Philippine International College – Antipolo City, Rizal
 Philippine Law Enforcement College – Tuguegarao City, Cagayan
Philippine Merchant Marine Academy – San Narciso, Zambales
Philippine Military Academy – Baguio
Philippine National Police Academy – Silang, Cavite
Philippine Nautical Technological College – Intramuros, Manila
Philippine Nazarene College – La Trinidad, Benguet
Philippine Normal University – Ermita, Manila
PRI College of Sciences – Quezon City, Metro Manila
Philippine School of Business Administration – Sampaloc, Manila 
Philippine State College of Aeronautics – Villamor Air Base, Pasay City, Metro Manila
Philippine Technological Institute of Science Arts and Trade – Central Inc., General Mariano Alvarez, Cavite
Philippine Technological Institute of Science Arts and Trade – Central Inc., Sta. Rosa, Laguna
Philippine Technological Institute of Science Arts and Trade – Central Inc., Tanay, Rizal
Philippine Women's College of Davao – Davao City
Philippine Women's University – Malate, Manila
Pilar College – Zamboanga City
Pilgrim University – Cagayan de Oro
Pinabacdao State University – Pinabacdao, Samar
Pines City Colleges – Baguio
PLT College – Bayombong, Nueva Vizcaya
PMI Colleges – Santa Cruz, Manila
Philippine Merchant Marine School (PMMS) – Las Piñas City, Metro Manila
Polangui Community College – Polangui, Albay
Polytechnic College of Davao Del Sur – Digos, Davao Del Sur
Polytechnic State University of Bicol – Nabua, Camarines Sur
Polytechnic University of the Philippines – Santa Mesa, Manila

Q
Queen of Apostles College Seminary – Tagum City, Davao del Norte
Quezon City University – Novaliches, Quezon City
Quezon Colleges of the North – Ballesteros, Cagayan
Quezon Colleges of Southern Philippines – Tacurong City, Sultan Kudarat
Quezon Memorial Institute of Siquijor, Siquijor
Quirino State University – Diffun, Quirino

R
Ramon Magsaysay Memorial Colleges – General Santos City, South Cotabato 
Ramon Magsaysay Technological University – Iba, Zambales
RC Al-Khwarizmi International College – Marawi City, Lanao del Sur
Red Aeronautics and Technological Institute – Silay City, Negros Occidental
Red Link Institute of Science & Technology – Calamba City, Laguna
Regis Marie College – Parañaque City, Metro Manila
Remedios T. Romualdez Memorial School – Makati City, Metro Manila
Republic Central Colleges – Angeles City, Pampanga
Riverside College – Bacolod City, Negros Occidental
Rizal College – Calamba City, Laguna
Rizal Memorial Colleges – Davao City
Rizal Memorial Institute – Dapitan City, Zamboanga del Norte
Rizal Technological University – Mandaluyong City, Metro Manila
Rogationist College – Silang, Cavite
Romblon State University – Odiongan, Romblon
Romeo Padilla University – Urdaneta City, Pangasinan
Royal Christian College – Mandaue City, Cebu

S
Sacred Heart College – Lucena City, Quezon
Sacred Heart College – Tacloban City, Leyte
Saint Bridget College – Batangas City, Batangas
Saint Clare College – Cauayan City, Isabela
Saint Columban College – Pagadian City, Zamboanga del Sur
Saint Ferdinand College – Ilagan City, Isabela
Saint Francis of Assisi College – Las Piñas City, Metro Manila
Saint Francis Institute of Computer Studies – San Pedro City, Laguna
Saint Gabriel College – Kalibo, Aklan
Saint John Colleges – Calamba City, Laguna
Saint John and Paul Colleges – Calamba City, Laguna
Saint Joseph College – Maasin City, Southern Leyte
Saint Joseph's College – Montalban, Rizal
Saint Joseph's College – Quezon City, Metro Manila
Saint Joseph College of Sindangan – Zamboanga del Norte
Saint Joseph Institute of Technology – Butuan City, Agusan del Norte
Saint Jude College – Sampaloc, Manila
Saint Louis College La Union – San Fernando City, La Union
Saint Louis University, Baguio – Baguio
Saint Tonis College, Inc. – Tabuk City, Kalinga
Saint Mary’s College of Catbalogan – Catbalogan, Samar 
Saint Mary's College of Quezon City – Metro Manila
Saint Mary's University of Cebu – Cebu City, Cebu
Saint Mary's University (Philippines) – Bayombong, Nueva Vizcaya
Saint Michael College of Caraga – Nasipit, Agusan del Norte
Saint Michael College of Hindang Leyte – Hindang, Leyte
Saint Michael's College – Cantilan, Surigao del Sur
Saint Michael's College – Guagua, Pampanga
Saint Pedro Poveda College – Quezon City, Metro Manila
Saint Rita College – Quiapo, Manila
Saint Theresa's College of Cebu City – Cebu
Saint Theresa's College of Quezon City – Metro Manila
Saint Vincent's College – Dipolog, Zamboanga del Norte
Samar State University – Catbalogan City, Samar
San Agustin Institute of Technology – Valencia City, Bukidnon,
San Beda College Alabang – Alabang Hills Village, Muntinlupa
San Beda University – San Miguel, Manila
San Carlos College – San Carlos City, Pangasinan
San Isidro College – Malaybalay City, Bukidnon
San Jose Christian Colleges – San Jose City, Nueva Ecija
San Jose Community College – Malilipot, Albay
San Juan de Dios College – Pasay, Metro Manila
San Lorenzo College – Kalibo, Aklan
San Mateo Municipal College – San Mateo, Rizal
San Pablo Colleges – San Pablo City, Laguna
San Pedro College – Davao City
San Pedro College of Business Administration – San Pedro City, Laguna
San Sebastian College - Recoletos de Manila – Quiapo, Manila
San Sebastian College - Recoletos de Cavite – Cavite City, Cavite
Santa Cruz Institute – Santa Cruz, Marinduque
Santa Isabel College Manila – Ermita, Manila
St. Anthony College Calapan City – Oriental Mindoro
St. Anthony College – Roxas City, Capiz
St. Anthony's College – San Jose de Buenavista, Antique
St. Anthony's College – Santa Ana, Cagayan 
St. Anthony College of Technology – Mabalacat City, Pampanga
St. Dominic College of Asia – Bacoor City, Cavite
St. Dominic College – Basco, Batanes
St. Ignatius Technical Institute of Business and Arts – Santa Rosa City, Laguna
St. James College of Parañaque – Parañaque City, Metro Manila
St. James College of Quezon City – Metro Manila
St. Joseph College Cavite City – Cavite
St. Joseph College-Olongapo – Olongapo City, Zambales
St. Jude Thaddeus Institute of Technology – Surigao City, Surigao del Norte
St. Linus University (St. Linus Online Institute) – Paniqui, Tarlac
St. Mary's Angels College of Pampanga – Santa Ana, Pampanga
St. Mary's College of Baganga – Baganga, Davao Oriental
St. Mary's College of Baliuag – Baliuag, Bulacan
St. Mary's College of Boac – Marinduque
St. Mary's College of Borongan – Eastern Samar
St. Mary's College of Labason – Labason, Zamboanga del Norte
St. Mary's College of Meycauayan – Meycauayan City, Bulacan
St. Mary's College of Tagum – Tagum City, Davao del Norte
St. Mary's College of Toledo – Toledo City, Cebu
St. Matthew College – San Mateo, Rizal
St. Michael's College – Iligan City, Lanao del Norte
St. Nicolas College of Business and Technology – San Fernando City, Pampanga
St. Paul College of Ilocos Sur – Bantay, Ilocos Sur
St. Paul College of Makati – Metro Manila
St. Paul College of Parañaque – Metro Manila
St. Paul College of Pasig – Metro Manila <
St. Paul College of Technology – Tarlac City
St. Peter's College – Balingasag, Misamis Oriental
St. Peter's College (Iligan) – Lanao del Norte
St. Peter's College of Ormoc – Ormoc City, Leyte
St. Peter's College of Toril – Davao City
St. Peter College of Technology – Capas, Tarlac
St. Pius X Seminary – Roxas City, Capiz
St. Rita College – Parañaque City, Metro Manila
St. Rita's College – Balingasag, Misamis Oriental 
St. Scholastica's College – Malate, Manila
St. Scholastica's College – Tacloban, Leyte
Sta. Teresa College – Bauan, Batangas
Sangguniang Kabataan University – Philippines
Santiago City Colleges – Santiago City, Isabela
Siargao Island Institute of Technology – Dapa, Surigao del Norte
Sibonga Community College – Sibonga, Cebu
Siena College of San Jose – San Jose del Monte, Bulacan
Siena College of Taytay – Rizal
Siena College of Quezon City – Metro Manila
Sierra College – Bayombong, Nueva Vizcaya
Silliman University – Dumaguete City, Negros Oriental
Siquijor State College (SSC) – Larena, Siquijor
SISTECH College – Santiago City, Isabela 
Skill Power Institute – Antipolo City, Rizal
Sorsogon State University – Sorsogon City, Sorsogon
South Central Mindanao State College – Kidapawan, Cotabato
South Forbes City College – Silang, Cavite
South Ilocandia College of Arts and Technology – Aringay, La Union
South Philippine Adventist College – Davao City
South SEED LPDH College – Las Piñas City, Metro Manila
Southeast Asian College – Quezon City, Metro Manila
Southeast Asia Interdisciplinary Development Institute – Antipolo City, Rizal
Southeastern College of Arts and Trades – Santiago City, Isabela
Southern Baptist College – Mlang, Cotabato
Southern Christian College – Midsayap, Cotabato
Southern Isabela College of Arts and Trades (TESDA) – Santiago City, Isabela 
Southern Leyte Business College – Maasin City, Southern Leyte
Southern Leyte State University – Sogod, Southern Leyte
Southern Luzon State University – Lucban, Quezon
Southern Luzon Technological College Foundation – Legazpi City, Albay
Southern Mindanao Colleges – Pagadian City, Zamboanga del Sur
Southern Philippine Academy College – Datu Piang, Maguindanao
Southern Philippines Agri-business and Marine and Aquatic School of Technology (SPAMAST) – Digos, Davao del Sur
Southern Philippines College – Cagayan de Oro
Southland College – Kabankalan City, Negros Occidental
Southville Foreign University – Las Piñas City, Metro Manila
Southville International School and Colleges – Las Piñas City, Metro Manila
Southway College of Technology – San Francisco, Agusan del Sur
Southwestern University – Cebu City, Cebu
SPJ International Technology Institute – Tinambac, Camarines Sur
STI College – Cainta, Rizal
Sto. Rosario Sapang Palay College – San Jose Del Monte City, Bulacan
Stonyhurst Southville International School – Batangas City, Batangas
Sultan Kudarat State University – Tacurong City, Sultan Kudarat
Sumulong College Of Arts And Sciences – Antipolo City, Rizal
Superior Institute of Science and Technology of Santiago City – Isabela
Surigao City Adventist Learning Center – Surigao City, Surigao del Norte
Surigao Education Center – Surigao City, Surigao del Norte
Surigao del Norte State University – Surigao City, Surigao del Norte
Systems Plus College Foundation – Angeles City, Pampanga

T
Tabaco College – Tabaco City, Albay
Tagoloan Community College – Tagoloan Misamis Oriental
Taguig City University – Taguig City, Metro Manila
Tagum Doctors College – Tagum City, Davao del Norte
Talisay City College – Talisay City, Cebu
Tanchuling College- Legazpi City, Albay
Tan Ting Bing Memorial Colleges Foundation – San Isidro, Northern Samar
Tarlac Agricultural University – Camiling, Tarlac
Tarlac State University – Tarlac City, Tarlac
Tasashyass College – Caloocan City, Metro Manila
Technological Institute of the Philippines – Quiapo, Manila
Technological University of the Philippines – Ermita, Manila
Thames International School – Quezon City, Metro Manila
The MARIAM School of Nursing – Lamitan City, Basilan
The ONE School – Makati City, Metro Manila
Tiwi Community College – Tiwi, Albay
Tomas Claudio Memorial College – Morong, Rizal
Tomas del Rosario College – Balanga, Bataan
Trace College – Los Baños, Laguna
Trece Martires City College - Trece Martires City, Cavite
Trent Information First Technical Career Institute – Taytay, Rizal
Treston International College – Taguig City, Metro Manila
Trinitas College – Meycauayan City, Bulacan
Trinity University of Asia – Quezon City, Metro Manila
Tubod College – Tubod, Lanao del Norte
Tyrone Valera University – Sindangan, Zamboanga del Norte

U
Unciano Colleges – Sta. Mesa, Manila
Unida Christian Colleges – Imus City, Cavite
Union Christian College – San Fernando City, La Union
Union College of Laguna – Santa Cruz, Laguna
  Universal Colleges of Paranaque – Paranaque City, Metro Manila
Universidad de Manila – Ermita, Manila 
Universidad de Sta. Isabel – Naga City, Camarines Sur
Universidad de Zamboanga – Zamboanga City
University of Antique – Sibalom, Antique
University of Asia and the Pacific – Pasig, Metro Manila
University of the Assumption – San Fernando, Pampanga
University of Baguio – Baguio
University of Batangas – Batangas City, Batangas
University of Bohol – Tagbilaran City, Bohol
University of Cagayan Valley – Tuguegarao City, Cagayan
University of Caloocan City – Caloocan City, Metro manila
University of Camarines Norte – Daet, Camarines Norte
University of Catbalogan City – Catbalogan City, Samar
University of Cebu – Cebu City, Cebu
University of the Cordilleras – Baguio
University of the East – Sampaloc, Manila
University of Eastern Philippines – Catarman, Northern Samar
University of Frederick Alcantara – Quezon City, Metro Manila
University of Iloilo – Iloilo City, Iloilo
University of the Immaculate Conception – Davao City
University of James Din – Quezon City, Metro Manila
University of La Salette – Santiago City, Isabela
University of Luzon – Dagupan City, Pangasinan
University of Makati – Makati City, Metro Manila
University of Manila – Sampaoc, Manila
University of Mindanao – Davao City
University of Negros Occidental - Recoletos – Bacolod, Negros Occidental
University of Northeastern Philippines – Iriga City, Camarines Sur
University of Northern Philippines – Vigan, Ilocos Sur
University of Nueva Caceres – Naga City, Camarines Sur
University of Pangasinan – Dagupan City, Pangasinan
University of Perpetual Help System – Las Piñas City, Metro Manila
University of the Philippines – Diliman, Quezon City
University of Rizal System – Tanay, Rizal
University of Saint Anthony – San Miguel, Iriga City
University of Saint La Salle – Bacolod City, Negros Occidental
University of Saint Louis Tuguegarao – Tuguegarao City, Cagayan
University of the Samar Island Archipelago – Catarman, Northern Samar
University of San Agustin – Iloilo City, Iloilo
University of San Carlos – Cebu City, Cebu
University of San Jose - Recoletos – Cebu City, Cebu
University of Santo Tomas-General Santos – General Santos City, South Cotabato
University of Santo Tomas–Legazpi – Legazpi City, Albay
University of Santo Tomas – Sampaloc, Manila
University of Santo Tomas – Santa Rosa, Laguna
  University of Santo Tomas – Angelicum College – Quezon City, Metro Manila
University of Southeastern Philippines – Davao City
University of Southern Mindanao – Kabacan, Cotabato
University of Southern Philippines Foundation – Cebu City, Cebu 
University of the Visayas – Cebu City, Cebu
Urdaneta City University – Urdaneta City, Pangasinan

V
Valencia Colleges – Valencia City, Bukidnon
Velez College – Cebu City, Cebu
Vineyard International Polytechnic College – Cagayan de Oro, Misamis Oriental 
Virgen Delos Remedios College – Olongapo City, Zambales
Virgen Milagrosa University Foundation – San Carlos, Pangasinan
Visayas State University – Baybay City, Leyte
Visca N Roxas College

W
WCC Aeronautical College – Grace Park, Caloocan City, Metro Manila
World Citi Colleges – Quezon City, Metro Manila
Worldtech Resources Institute (WRI) Colleges – Naga City, Camarines Sur 
Wesleyan University Philippines – Cabanatuan, Nueva Ecija
West Bay College – Alabang, Muntinlupa
Westbridge Institute of Technology – Cabuyao, Laguna
West Negros University – Bacolod City, Negros Occidental
West Visayas State University – Lapaz, Iloilo City
Western Institute of Technology – Lapaz, Iloilo City
Western Leyte College (WLC) – Ormoc City, Leyte
Western Mindanao State University – Baliwasan, Zamboanga City

X
Xavier University - Ateneo de Cagayan – Cagayan de Oro, Misamis Oriental

Z
Zamboanga Peninsula Polytechnic State University – Zamboanga City
Zamboanga del Sur Maritime Institute of Technology – Pagadian City, Zamboanga del Sur
Zamboanga State College of Marine Sciences and Technology – Zamboanga City
Zamora Memorial College – Bacacay, Albay

See also
Higher education in the Philippines
List of Jesuit educational institutions in the Philippines
List of universities and colleges in Metro Manila
List of universities and colleges in the Philippines by province

References

External links

 List of Higher Education Institutions at Commission on Higher Education (Philippines) 
List of colleges & universities in the Philippines by region/province at Finduniversity.ph
List of universities in the Philippines by region at courses.com.ph

 
 
 
Universities
Philippines
Philippines